Following is a list of notable restaurants known for serving Tex-Mex:

 Baja Fresh
 Bridges Cafe, Portland, Oregon, U.S.
 BurritoVille
 Chapultepec Lupita, Houston, Texas, U.S.
 Chi-Chi's
 Chili's
 Don Pablo's
 Esparza's, Portland, Oregon, U.S.
 La Bamba Mexican Restaurant
 La Salsa
 Maggie Rita's, Houston, Texas, U.S.
 Magnolia Cafe, Austin, Texas, U.S.
 Molina's Cantina, Houston, Texas, U.S.
 Nacho Borracho, Seattle
 Ninfa's
 Pancho Villa (restaurant)
 The Goose, Portland, Oregon, U.S.
 Tia's Tex-Mex
 Tijuana Flats
 Tortilla Coast, Washington, D.C., U.S.

Tex-Mex